BD+02 2056, also known as WASP-84 is a G-type main-sequence star. Its surface temperature is 5350 K, and is slightly enriched in heavy elements compared to the Sun, with a metallicity Fe/H index of 0.05. It is rich in carbon and depleted of oxygen. BD+02 2056's age is probably older than the Sun at 8.5 billion years. The star appears to have an anomalously small radius, which can be explained by the unusually high helium fraction or by it being very young.

A multiplicity survey did not detect any stellar companions to BD+02 2056 as at 2015.

Planetary system
In 2013, one planet, named WASP-84b, was discovered on a tight, circular orbit. The planet cannot have formed in its current location and likely migrated from elsewhere. The planetary orbit is well aligned with the equatorial plane of the star, misalignment being equal to 0.3°. Planetary equilibrium temperature is  832 K.

References

Hydra (constellation)
Planetary transit variables
G-type main-sequence stars
Planetary systems with one confirmed planet
J08442570+0151361
BD+02 2056